The Spitzer Cross is an enameled metal crucifix, made c.1190 in Limoges, in France, by an artisan known as the "Master of the Royal Plantagenet Workshop", and now held by the Cleveland Museum of Art.  The work is made from copper, engraved and gilded, and inlaid with champlevé Limoges enamel, depicting Christ on the cross in tones of blue, green, yellow, red and white.  It may have been made as a processional cross for the Abbey of Grandmont: similar Limoges enamel crosses are held in other public collections, including the Metropolitan Museum of Art and the British Museum.

The cross measures .  The white figure of the crucified Christ is depicted in a sinuous pose with head bowed to the left, nailed to a green tinted cross. The copper ground emerges through the enamel to pick out details of ribs and muscles, with a memento mori of a white skull below his feet.  A blue loin cloth with green edging is tied about his hips, hanging to his knees.  His rose face has a red beard, and reddish hair drapes down over his shoulders.  The plain white skin of the Christ figure contrasts with the bright green, blue, and yellow colours of his halo and loincloth, and the cross.  Above his head are two inscriptions, the Christogram "IHS" and the Chi Rho "XPS" (for "Jesus" and "Christ", respectively; that is, "ΙΗΣΟΥΣ" and "ΧΡΙΣΤΟΣ" in Greek letters).  The four ends of the cross are decorated with figures of saints and angels. 

The cross was owned by B. Meyers, and then acquired by the 19th century art dealer Frédéric Spitzer, after whom it is named.  It was sold (lot 228) for 5,500 francs at the Spitzer sale held by the art dealers Paul Chevalier and Charles Mannheim in Paris in 1893, and acquired by the New York art dealers Arnold Seligmann, Rey, & Co.  It was donated to Cleveland Museum of Art in 1923, by Jeptha Homer Wade II.  The catalogue of the Cleveland Museum of Art describes it as the finest Limoges enameled cross to survive.

In its original form, the crucifixion scene of the Spitzer Cross would have been on one side of a processional cross, with a depiction of Christ in Majesty on the other side surrounded by plaques with the symbols of all Four Evangelists: the Tetramorph.  Two plaques of the correct shape, thought to be from the reverse of the Spitzer Cross, are known: one depicting the eagle of John the Evangelist is held by the Metropolitan Museum of Art, and the other depicting the ox of Luke the Evangelist is held in a private collection.

References
 The "Spitzer Cross", Cleveland Museum of Art
 The Spitzer Collection, Dumbarton Oaks
 "63.  Two plaques from a cross", Enamels of Limoges: 1100-1350, John Philip O'Neill (editor), Musée du Louvre, Metropolitan Museum of Art, 1996,  
 "Résumé du catalogue des objets d'art et de haute curiosité, antiques, du Moyen-age et de la renaissance : composant l'importante et précieuse collection Spitzer",  1893, p.41
 Central Plaque of a Cross, Metropolitan Museum of Art
 Plaque from a Cross with the Eagle of Saint John, Metropolitan Museum of Art

Limoges enamel
Processional crosses
12th-century sculptures
Sculptures of the Cleveland Museum of Art
Medieval European metalwork objects
Romanesque sculptures